A High Wind in Jamaica is a 1929 novel by the Welsh writer Richard Hughes, which was made into a film of the same name in 1965. The book was initially titled The Innocent Voyage and published by Harper & Brothers in the spring of that year. Several months later Hughes renamed his novel in time for its British publication, and Harper followed suit. The original title retained some currency, as evidenced by Paul Osborn's 1943 stage adaptation. There have since been two radio adaptations (one written in 1950 by Jane Speed for NBC University Theater; the other in 2000 by Bryony Lavery for BBC Radio 4), with the title A High Wind in Jamaica.

Plot
The Bas-Thornton children (John, Emily, Edward, Rachel, and Laura) are raised on a plantation in Jamaica at an unspecified time after the emancipation of slaves in the British Empire (1834). It is a time of technological transformation, and sailing ships and steamers coexist on the high seas. A high wind destroys their home, and the parents decide the children must leave the island to return to their original home in England. Accompanied by two creole children from Jamaica, Margaret and Harry Fernandez, they leave on the Clorinda, a merchant ship under the command of Captain Marpole. The Clorinda is seized by pirates shortly after leaving Jamaica.

The pirates first pretend they need to seize the ship's cargo and will refund the price of the goods taken, but when the lie becomes obvious, they menace Captain Marpole by threatening to shoot the children if he does not disclose where the Clorinda'''s safe is kept. The ship is ransacked, and the children are brought aboard the pirate schooner to get dinner. Captain Marpole, thinking that under cover of darkness the children have been murdered, flees the scene, unknowingly abandoning the children to the pirates. Marpole writes a letter to Mr and Mrs Thornton informing them that their children have been murdered by the pirates.

The children quickly become part of life aboard the pirate ship and treat it as their new home. They are treated with some indifference, though a few crew members—José the cook and Otto the chief mate—care for them and become fond of them, and Captain Jonsen, the pirate captain himself, becomes very fond of Emily.

The pirates stop at their home base of Santa Lucia (in current-day province Pinar del Río, Cuba) to sell the seized goods. Captain Jonsen tries unsuccessfully to convince a rich woman to take care of the children. During the night, José takes John, Edward, and Margaret ashore, and John accidentally falls to his death in a warehouse. He is immediately and deliberately forgotten by his own siblings. The pirate captain seems to be the last one to forget him.

While drunk, Captain Jonsen makes a sexual overture to Emily. She bites his hand before anything happens, but she is frightened by the look in Jonsen's eye as he reaches for her.  The author gives no explicit details for her fright, just a veiled description from Emily's point of view. Emily later suffers an injury to her leg, in an accident caused by Rachel, and is confined to the captain's cabin.  Meanwhile, Margaret, who has become alienated from the other children, becomes Otto's lover and moves into his cabin.

Having made no further captures, the pirates quickly take the first ship they finally see, a Dutch vessel transporting some wild animals. The captain of this ship is tied up and left in the cabin with Emily. Everyone else on the pirate ship boards the Dutch vessel to watch a fight between a lion and a tiger. The Dutch captain does all he can to get Emily to free him but is unable to communicate with her. Finally seeing a knife he rolls towards it. Emily, injured and terrified, screams but no one hears. She pounces at the last second and stabs the captain several times. He soon dies. Margaret, oldest of the children, witnesses this event. When the crew returns to the ship, some of the pirates mistake Margaret for the murderer and without ceremony throw her overboard, but she is rescued by other pirates heading back to the ship.

The crew grows tired and scared of the children. Jonsen arranges for them to transfer to a passing steamer. Disguised as a British merchant vessel, the captain claims that some pirates abandoned the children on the Cuban shore and that he then picked them up to bring them to England. Before sending them on board the steamer, Otto instructs Emily not to disclose the truth about what has happened to them in the past months. He chooses Emily rather than Margaret, as the latter seems to have lost her sanity.

Once aboard the steamer, the children are delighted with the boat's luxury and the loving treatment by the passengers, who know of the story of the children told by Captain Marpole.

Despite her fondness for Captain Jonsen and the fact that she promised not to tell about what really happened, Emily quickly tells the truth to a stewardess. The pirate ship is pursued and seized by the British authorities.

Back in London, the children are reintegrated into their families. They seem completely unaffected by their traumatic experiences aboard the ship, apart from Margaret who has lost her sanity. (It is hinted that she may also be pregnant.) Emily is only half aware of the crime she has committed. The younger children have distorted and contradictory memories of the facts, and after unsuccessfully attempting to extract any information from them, the family solicitor decides that only Emily should testify at the trial against the pirate crew and then only to repeat a statement written by him.

Under the pressure of the courtroom, Emily breaks down and cries out that the Dutch captain died as she watched. She does not exactly say who performed the murder, but the trial's outcome is decided. The pirates are executed.

The book ends with Emily playing with her schoolmates. She is so similar to them that "only God", but no one else, could tell them apart.

Critical reception
The book received much criticism for its content at the time of release. Many critics responded negatively to the behaviour and treatment of the children in the novel, ranging from sexual abuse to murder.

Others lauded Hughes for contradicting the Victorian romances of childhood by portraying the children without emotional reduction. The book is often given credit for influencing and paving the way for novels such as Lord of the Flies by William Golding.

In 1998, A High Wind in Jamaica'' was included as number 71 in the Modern Library's 100 Best Novels, a list of the best English-language novels of the 20th century.

Trivia

The cocktail Hangman's Blood is first described in this novel.

References

External links
 Introduction by Francine Prose
 1950 Radio adaptation
 2000 Radio adaptation

1929 British novels
British novels adapted into films
Novels about pirates
Chatto & Windus books
Novels set in the Caribbean